Helm is a masculine given name which may refer to:

Helm Glöckler (1909–1993), German racing driver
Helm Roos (1930–1992), South African Army officer
Helm Spencer (1891–1974), English cricketer
Helm Stierlin (born 1926), German psychiatrist
Helm van Zijl (1909–1992), South African judge

Masculine given names